Sultan Ahmad Shah II Bridge or Semantan Bridge is the longest highway bridge in the East Coast Expressway network. It bridges the Pahang River in Pahang, Malaysia. This 700-metre bridge was opened when the East Coast Expressway was built. It crosses the Pahang River, the longest river in west Malaysia. At the entrance of the bridge there are 2 elephant trunks which symbolize Pahang. There also many colorful lights around this bridge. This bridge was opened by Sultan of Pahang, Sultan Ahmad Shah on 22 April 2004. Near the bridge is the Temerloh Rest and Service Area (both bound).

Gallery

See also
Sultan Ahmad Shah Bridge (Temerloh Bridge)
Sultan Ahmad Shah III Bridge (Chenor Bridge)

Bridges completed in 2004
Bridges in Pahang